Albert Hill VC (24 May 1895 – 17 February 1971) was an English recipient of the Victoria Cross, the highest and most prestigious award for gallantry in the face of the enemy that can be awarded to British and Commonwealth forces.

Early life
Born in Hulme, Manchester, one of ten children, he was a weak and frail child who after his schooling started work in a mill, before becoming an apprentice planker at Wilson Hat Manufacturers, in Wilton Street, Denton (Manchester).

First World War 
In August 1914 he joined the 10th Battalion, the Royal Welsh Fusiliers, as a private. He was awarded the Victoria Cross for his actions at Delville Wood, part of the Battle of the Somme in 1916. His citation read:

He was also a holder of the French Croix de Guerre, the Russian Cross of St. George, and three campaign medals.

Later years
In February 1919 he returned to work in Wilson's factory, and married Doris Wilson a year later. They emigrated to the United States in 1923, where he found work as a building labourer, and had three daughters and a son. He attempted to enlist on the outbreak of the Second World War, but was advised to do defence work instead.

He died in Pawtucket, Rhode Island in 1971 and was buried with full military honours in Highland Memorial Park, Johnston, Rhode Island.

Hill Court in Wrexham is named in his honour.

The Medal
His Victoria Cross is displayed in the Royal Welch Fusiliers Museum in Caernarfon Castle.

References

External links

 

1895 births
1971 deaths
British Battle of the Somme recipients of the Victoria Cross
People from Hulme
Royal Welch Fusiliers soldiers
British Army personnel of World War I
Recipients of the Croix de Guerre 1914–1918 (France)
English emigrants to the United States
Recipients of the Cross of St. George
British Army recipients of the Victoria Cross
Burials in Rhode Island
Military personnel from Lancashire